The Peloponnese Region is a region in southern Greece. It borders Western Greece to the north and Attica to the north-east. It covers most of the Peloponnese peninsula, except for the northwestern subregions of Achaea and Elis which belong to Western Greece and a small portion of the Argolid peninsula that is part of Attica.

Administration 
The Peloponnese Region was established in the 1987 administrative reform. With the 2011 Kallikratis plan, its powers and authority were redefined and extended. Along with the Western Greece and Ionian Islands regions, it is supervised by the Decentralized Administration of Peloponnese, Western Greece and the Ionian Islands based at Patras.

The region is based at Tripoli and is divided into five regional units (pre-Kallikratis prefectures), 
 Arcadia,  
 Argolis,  
 Corinthia,  
 Laconia and  
 Messenia, 
which are further subdivided into 26 municipalities. The largest city of the region is Kalamata.

Major communities
 Kalamáta (Καλαμάτα) (population 2011: 54,567)
 Trípoli (Τρίπολη) (population 2011: 30,912)
 Kórinthos (Κόρινθος) (Corinth in English) (population 2011: 30,176)
 Árgos (Άργος) (population 2011: 22.209)
 Sparti (Σπάρτη) (population 2011: 17,408)

Demographics
The region has shrunk by 41,537 people between 2011 and 2021, experiencing a population loss of 6.8%.

Economy 
The Gross domestic product (GDP) of the region was 8.2 billion € in 2018, accounting for 4.5% of Greek economic output. GDP per capita adjusted for purchasing power was 17,400 € or 57% of the EU27 average in the same year. The GDP per employee was 68% of the EU average.

References

External links

  

 
States and territories established in 1987
Administrative regions of Greece